Benoît Allemane (born 28 December 1942) is a French actor who specializes in dubbing. He is the official French dub-over voice of Morgan Freeman. According to IMDb, he also provided the voice of King Harkinian in Link: The Faces of Evil.

Roles

Filmography
 1980 : Julien Fontanes, magistrat (1 Episode)

Television animation
Argai: The Prophecy (Pacha)
Chris Colorado (Jack Mitchell)
Fullmetal Alchemist (Alex Louis Armstrong)
Gadget and the Gadgetinis (Doctor Claw)
Gargoyles (Goliath)
TaleSpin (Baloo)
Castle in the Sky (General)
An American Tail: The Treasure of Manhattan Island (Mr. Grasping)

OVA
The Land Before Time series (Grandpa)

Theatrical animation
Hercules (Zeus)
We're Back! A Dinosaur's Story (Rex)

Video games
Alan Wake (Pat Maine) local radio night host on Bright Falls KBF-FM Radio (French)
Blood Omen 2 (Kain)
Diablo II (Qual Kehk)
Fable II (Abbot)
Guild Wars Nightfall (General Morgahn)
Harry Potter and the Philosopher's Stone (Rubeus Hagrid)
Halo 2 (Tartarus)
Kingdom Hearts II (Yen Sid)
Legacy of Kain: Defiance (Kain)
Legacy of Kain: Soul Reaver (Kain, The Elder God)
The Legend of Spyro: A New Beginning (Terrador)
The Legend of Spyro: The Eternal Night (Terrador)
The Legend of Spyro: Dawn of the Dragon (Terrador)
Link: The Faces of Evil (King Harkinian)
The Lion King: Simba's Mighty Adventure (Mufasa)
Looney Tunes Racing (Foghorn Leghorn)
Looney Tunes: Space Race (Foghorn Leghorn)
Mass Effect (Sovereign)
MediEvil: Resurrection (Narrator, Death)
Le Pic Rouge: L'auberge de l'alpiniste mort
Sherlock Holmes: The Awakened (Sherlock Holmes)
Sherlock Holmes: Secret of the Silver Earring (Sherlock Holmes)
Sherlock Holmes versus Arsène Lupin (Sherlock Holmes)
Skylanders: Spyro's Adventure (Stump Smash)
Skylanders: Giants (Stump Smash and Tree Rex)
Soul Reaver 2 (Kain, The Elder God)
The Simpsons Game (Space museum commentator)
Titan Quest (Jade Emperor)
The Witcher (Vesemir)
Zelda: The Wand of Gamelon (King Harkinian)
Sonic the Hedgehog (series) (Zavok)

Live action
The Frighteners (Sheriff Walt Perry)
The League of Extraordinary Gentlemen (Captain Nemo)
Looney Tunes: Back in Action (Foghorn Leghorn)
The Meteor Man (Earnest Moses)
Morgan Freeman
The Naked Gun: From the Files of Police Squad! (Captain Ed Hocken)
The Naked Gun 2½: The Smell of Fear (Captain Ed Hocken)
Naked Gun : The Final Insult (Captain Ed Hocken)
Star Wars: Episode II – Attack of the Clones (Lama Su Kaminoan)

Commercials
Frosted Flakes (Tony the Tiger)

References

External links 
Official site

1942 births
Living people
French male film actors
French male television actors
French male video game actors
French male voice actors